The Loyalty bent-winged bat (Miniopterus robustior) is a species of vesper bat in the family Miniopteridae. It is found only in New Caledonia.

References

Miniopteridae
Mammals described in 1914
Bats of Oceania
Taxonomy articles created by Polbot